Labial artery may refer to

 Inferior labial artery
 Posterior labial arteries
 Prominent inferior labial artery
 Superior labial artery